The 1970 Wisconsin gubernatorial election was held on November 3, 1970.  Democrat Patrick Lucey won the election with 54% of the vote, winning his first term as Governor of Wisconsin and defeating Republican Jack B. Olson. Roman R. Blenski unsuccessfully sought the Republican nomination.

Results

References

1970 Wisconsin elections
Wisconsin
1970